Blue State Coffee was a company that ran a group of coffee stores in Providence, Rhode Island, New Haven, Connecticut, and Hartford, Connecticut, selling their own small-batch coffees.

History
The company launched a website in September 2006. It is run by CEO Carolyn Greenspan. The first store opened in July 2007 on Thayer Street in Providence, on edge of Brown University's campus.

In February 2009, Blue State Coffee opened two more stores: one in the Brown University Bookstore and another in New Haven, near Yale University

Throughout the 2010s, it opened additional stores in New Haven, Boston, and Hartford, eventually running a total of nine. By 2020, it had downsized slightly, having closed its two Boston stores and the Brown Bookstore location. In the fall of 2022, it closed all of its remaining locations and sold off its remaining stock of coffee and other merchandise.

Political involvement
Blue State cafes have hosted speakers and events for a variety of causes. Notable speakers have included Al Franken (while running for senate in Minnesota), Kal Penn (while campaigning for Barack Obama), and Craig Robinson (Michelle Obama's brother).

Philanthropy
Blue State Coffee has donated over $1,000,000 to non-profit organizations in Providence, New Haven, Hartford, and Boston.

See also
 List of coffeehouse chains

References

External links
 Official website
 A Yale Daily News interview with Drew Ruben, co-founder of Blue State Coffee

Coffeehouses and cafés in the United States